The Military ranks of Belize are the military insignia used by the Belize Defence Force and Belize Coast Guard. Belize shares a rank structure similar to those used in the United Kingdom and the United States of America.

Commissioned officer ranks
The rank insignia of commissioned officers.

Other ranks
The rank insignia of non-commissioned officers and enlisted personnel.

References

Notes

External links
 
 
 Ambergristoday.com (Belize Coast Guard Promotes Sanpedrana Alma Pinelo To Lieutenant Commander)
 Ambergristoday.com (Belize Coast Guard Females Giveaway Shoes)
 Channel5belize.com (Coast Guard Graduates 46)
 bcg.gov.bz (State Of The Belize Coast Guard 2019)

Belize
Military of Belize